This is a list of United States military units that participated in the Mexican–American War. The list includes regular U.S. Army, Navy, Marine Corps, and Revenue Marine Service units and ships as well as the units of the militia that various states recruited for the war. The commanding officer of each unit or ship is identified when there are references with content that aids identification. Dates are included when they are available in the references.

Regular U.S. Army regiments serving in Mexico from 1846 to 1848

Regiments of dragoons
 1st Regiment of Dragoons, Colonel Richard B. Mason
 2nd Regiment of Dragoons, Colonel William S. Harney
 3rd Regiment of Dragoons, Colonel Edward G. W. Butler, (appointed from Louisiana)

Mounted riflemen
 Regiment of Mounted Riflemen, Colonel Persifor F. Smith

Regiments of artillery
 1st Regiment of Artillery, Lt. Colonel Benjamin K. Pierce
 2nd Regiment of Artillery, Colonel James Monroe Bankhead
 3rd Regiment of Artillery, Colonel William Gates
 4th Regiment of Artillery, Lt. Colonel Matthew M. Payne

Regiments of infantry

 1st Regiment of Infantry, Colonel William Davenport
 2nd Regiment of Infantry, Lt. Colonel Bennet Riley
 3rd Regiment of Infantry, Lt. Colonel Ethan A. Hitchcock
 4th Regiment of Infantry, Lt. Colonel John Garland
 5th Regiment of Infantry, Lt. Colonel James S. Mcintosh
 6th Regiment of Infantry, Colonels: Zachary Taylor; Newman S. Clarke
 7th Regiment of Infantry, Lt. Colonel Joseph Plympton
 8th Regiment of Infantry, Colonel William J. Worth

Regiments of infantry, 1847
These units were raised according to an act of Congress, 11 February 1847 for an enlistment period of one year.
 9th Regiment of Infantry, Colonel Truman B. Ransom, (appointed from Vermont)
 10th Regiment of Infantry, Colonel Robert E. Temple, (appointed from New York)
 11th Regiment of Infantry, Colonel Albert C. Ramsey, (appointed from Pennsylvania)
 12th Regiment of Infantry, Colonel Milledge L. Bonham, (appointed from South Carolina)
 13th Regiment of Infantry, Colonel Robert M. Echols, (appointed from Georgia)
 14th Regiment of Infantry, Colonel William Trousdale, (appointed from Tennessee)
 15th Regiment of Infantry, Colonel George W. Morgan, (appointed from Ohio)
 16th Regiment of Infantry, Colonel John W. Tibbatts, (appointed from Kentucky)
 Regiment of Voltigeurs and Foot Riflemen, Colonel Timothy P. Andrews, (appointed from District of Columbia)

Volunteer units serving in Mexico from 1846 to 1848

Alabama
 Battalion of Alabama Volunteers, for 3 months (4 companies); May–August 1846. Lt. Colonel Phillip H. Raiford
 Battalion of Alabama Volunteers, for the duration of the war with Mexico (5 companies); November and December 1847 – June 1848. Major John I. Seibels
 3 Independent Companies of Alabama Volunteers, for 6 months; received for 3 months, May–August 1846:
 1st Independent Company of Alabama Volunteers, for 6 months; Captain Robert Desha
 2nd Independent Company of Alabama Volunteers, for 6 months; Captain William H. Platt
 3rd Independent Company of Alabama Volunteers, for 6 months; Captain Rush Elmore
 Independent Company of Alabama Mounted Volunteers, for the duration; June 1847 – July 1848. Captain James McGee

Arkansas

 Regiment of Arkansas Mounted Volunteers, for 12 months; June 1846 – June 1847. Colonels: Archibald Yell (killed at Buena Vista); John S. Roane (Lt. Colonel to 28 February 1847)
 Independent Companies of Arkansas Mounted Volunteers in the Mexican War:
 1st Independent Company, Arkansas Mounted Volunteers; 27 May 1847 – 24 June 1848. Captain Gaston Meares (late Lt. Colonel Arkansas Volunteer Regiment)
 2nd Independent Company, Arkansas Mounted Volunteers; 15 June 1847 – June 1848. Captain Stephen B. Euyart; Served in New Mexico, and on the Rio Grande

California

 Battalions of California Volunteers, for 3 and for 6 months; recruited in July and October 1846 – April 1847. Lt. Colonel Commanding John C. Fremont (Bvt. Captain Topographic Engineers and Major of Volunteers, 23 July and 26 October 1846 – 19 April 1847)
Mounted Rifle Company A. Captain Richard Owens
Mounted Rifle Company B. Captain Henry S. Ford
Mounted Rifle Company C. Captain Granville P. Swift
Mounted Rifle Company D. Captain John Sears
Mounted Rifle Company E. Captain John Grigsby
Mounted Rifle Company F. Captain Lansford W. Hastings
Mounted Rifle Company G. Captain B. K. Thompson
Mounted Rifle Company H. Captain Richard T. Jacobs (Spy Company chiefly of native Indians)
Artillery Company A. Captain John K. Wilson (Midshipman U.S. Navy)
Artillery Company. Captain William Findlay
 Mounted Rifle Company. Captain Samuel Gibson (wounded at San Pasqual)
 Company of Native Californians. Captain Santiago E. Arguello

Florida
 1st Independent Company of Florida Volunteers, for 12 months; February 1847 – March 1848. Captain William W. J. Kelly; Served at Guadaloupe and Santa Fe, Mexico
 2nd Independent Company of Florida Volunteers, for the duration; August 1847 – July 1848. Captains: K. G. Livingston, (died 9 February 1848 at Guadaloupe, Mexico); George Holmes (2nd Lieutenant to March 1848)

Georgia
 Regiment of Georgia Volunteers, for 12 months; June 1846 – May 1847. Colonel Henry R. Jackson
 Battalion of Georgia Volunteers, for the duration, (5 companies); July 1847 – July 1848. Lt. Colonel Isaac G. Seymour
 Battalion of Georgia Mounted Volunteers, for the duration, (6 companies); September 1847 – July 1848. Lt. Colonel James S. Calhoun (late Capt. in Jackson's Regt.)
 Independent Company of Georgia Mounted Men; May 1847 – August 1848. Captain John Loyall

Illinois
 1st Regiment of Illinois Volunteers, for 12 months; June 1846 – June 1847. Colonels: John J. Hardin (Killed at BuenaVista); William Weatherford (Lt. Colonel to 26 February 1847)
 2nd Regiment of Illinois Volunteers, for 12 months; June 1846 – June 1847. Colonel William H. Bissell
 3rd Regiment of Illinois Volunteers, for 12 months; July 1846 – May 1847. Colonel Ferris Foreman
 4th Regiment of Illinois Volunteers, for 12 months; July 1846 – May 1847. Colonel Edward D. Baker
 1st Regiment of Illinois Volunteers, for the duration; June 1847 – October 1848. Colonel Edward W. B. Newby
 2nd Regiment of Illinois Volunteers, for the duration; August 1847 – July 1848. Colonel James Collins
Independent Companies of Illinois Mounted Volunteers:
 1st Company Illinois Mounted Volunteers; 21 May 1847 – 7 November 1848. Captain Adams Dunlap (served with Brigadier General Wool)
 2nd Company Illinois Mounted Volunteers; August 1847 – 26 July 1848. Captain Wyatt B. Stapp
 3rd Company Illinois Mounted Volunteers; 13 August 1847 – 26 October 1848. Captain Michael K. Lawler (served with Brigadier General Wool)
 4th Company Illinois Mounted Volunteers; 13 September 1847 – 25 July 1848. Captain Josiah Littell

Indiana
 1st Regiment of Indiana Volunteers, for 12 months; June 1846 – June 1847. Colonel James P. Drake
 2nd Regiment of Indiana Volunteers, for 12 months; June 1846 – June 1847. Colonels: Joseph Lane (appointed Brigadier General U.S. Volunteers, 1 July 1846); William A. Bowles
 3rd Regiment of Indiana Volunteers, for 12 months; June 1846 – June 1847. Colonel James H. Lane
 4th Regiment of Indiana Volunteers, for the duration; June 1847 – July 1848. Colonel Willis A. Gorman (late Major of J. H. Lane's Regt.)
 5th Regiment of Indiana Volunteers, for the duration; October 1847 – July 1848. Colonel James H. Lane (late Colonel 3rd Regiment Indiana 12 months Volunteers)

Iowa
 Battalion of Iowa "Mormon" Volunteers, for 12 months, (5 companies); recruited and mustered at Council Bluffs, Indian Territory on 16 July 1846 and discharged 16 July 1847 at Los Angeles; Lt. Colonels: James Allen (Captain 1st U.S. Dragoons, died at Fort Leavenworth 23 August 1846); acting commander Jefferson Hunt (senior Captain, Co A, Mormon Battalion, from 23 to 29 August 1846); Andrew Jackson Smith (1st Lieutenant 1st Dragoons, acting 30 August 1846 to 12 October 1846); Philip St. George Cooke (Captain 1st Dragoons, 13 October 1846 – 13 May 1847 when he relinquished command of the Battalion to accompany Gen. Stephen W. Kearny back to Ft. Leavenworth); acting commander Jefferson Hunt (senior Captain, Co A, Mormon Battalion, from 13 May to 16 July 1847).

The Mormon Battalion was recruited as a federal volunteer unit, not through the state of Iowa which was not created until December 1846. The Mormon Battalion was raised at the express invitation of President James K. Polk, not as part of any state or territorial requisition for troops.

The contemporary official Army documents refer to the unit in the following ways; Prior to Allen recruiting the unit as, "Capt. Allen's Battalion of Volunteers". As the new unit was being recruited and mustered into service, its first commander, James Allen, signed official documents with the name he gave the unit, "Mormon Battalion", General Stephen Watts Kearny, in letters of reply to the unit used Allen's naming convention, calling it the "Battalion of Mormons" and "Mormon Battalion" P. St. George Cooke, commanding the Battalion under orders from Gen Kearny used the name, "Mormon Battalion" when reporting troop strengths in California.

Kentucky
 Regiment of Kentucky Cavalry Volunteers, for 12 months; June 1846 – July 1847. Colonel Humphrey Marshall (former 2nd Lt 1. U.S. Dragoons.) 
 1st Regiment of Kentucky Volunteers, for 12 months, "Louisville Legion"; May 1846 – May 1847. Colonel Stephen Ormsby 
 2nd Regiment of Kentucky Volunteers, for 12 months; June 1846 – June 1847. Colonels: William R. McKee (former 1st Lt. 3rd. U.S. Artillery, killed.); Lt. Colonel Henry Clay, Jr. (former 2nd Lt. 2nd. U.S. Artillery, killed); Major Gary H. Fry (former 2nd Lt, 3rd. U.S. Infantry)
 3rd Regiment of Kentucky Volunteers, for the duration; October 1847 – July 1848. Colonel Manlius V. Thomson
 4th Regiment Kentucky Volunteers, for the duration; October 1847 – July 1848. Colonel John S. Williams (late Capt. of Independent Company)
 Independent Company of Kentucky Volunteers; May 1846 – May 1847. Captain John S. Williams (served with the 6th U.S. Infantry)

Louisiana
 Louisiana Battalion of Volunteer Artillery, for 3 months; (2 companies); 21 August – November 1845. Major Louis Gaily
 2nd Battalion of Louisiana Volunteer Artillery, for 6 months, (3 companies), received for 3 months, May–July 1846. Major Louis Gaily (commander 1st Battery)
 Brigade of Louisiana Volunteers, for 6 months, (6 regiments); received, for 3 months. May and June–August 1846. Brigadier General Persifor F. Smith
 1st Regiment, P. F. Smith's Brigade of Louisiana Volunteers. Colonel James B. Walton
 2d Regiment, P. F. Smith's Brigade of Louisiana Volunteers. Colonel James H. Dakin
 3rd Regiment, P. F. Smith's Brigade of Louisiana Volunteers. Colonel Samuel F. Marks
 4th Regiment, P. F. Smith's Brigade of Louisiana Volunteers. Colonel Horatio Davis
 5th Regiment, P. F. Smith's Brigade of Louisiana Volunteers. Colonel Baillie Peyton
 Independent Company of Louisiana Volunteers, for 12 months; July 1846 – May 1847. Captain Albert G. Blanchard (former 1st Lieutenant in 3rd U.S. Infantry, and Captain 3rd Louisiana Volunteers)
 Regiment of Louisiana Volunteers, for the duration; December 1846 – July 1848. Colonel Louis G. De Russy (formerly Capt. U.S. Artillery and Paymaster)
 Battalion of Louisiana Volunteers, for the duration, (5 companies); May 1847 – July 1848. Lt. Colonel Charles Fiesca (late Major 4th Regiment Louisiana Volunteers)
 Battalion of Louisiana Mounted Volunteers, for 12 months, (5 companies); July and August 1847 – July 1848. Lt. Colonel Walter F. Biscoe (late 2nd Lieutenant in 2nd Regiment Louisiana Volunteers)

Maryland and the District of Columbia
 Battalion of Maryland and District of Columbia Volunteers, for 12 months, (6 companies); May 1846 – May 1847. Commanders: Lt. Colonel William H. Watson (killed at Monterey); Brevet Major Robert C. Buchanan (Captain 4th U.S. Infantry Regiment, from November 1846)
 Regiment of Maryland and District of Columbia Volunteers, for the duration, (8 companies); May and June 1847 – 24 July 1848. Colonel George W. Hughes (Captain and brevet Lt. Colonel Topographic Engineers)
 3 additional Separate Companies were attached to this Regiment:
 Tennessee Company of Mounted Volunteers; May 1847 to July 1848. Captain C. Roberdeau Wheat (served with 2nd Dragoons; Major General Scott's bodyguard)
 Pittsburg Company; October 1847 to July 1848. Captain Thomas A. Rowley
 Independent Company; 8 June 1847 – 1 August 1848. Captains: James Boyd, (Captain in Watson's Battery; killed at Rio Calaboso, 12 July 1847); Joseph R. West, (served at Tampico under Colonel De Russy)

Maine 
 1st Regiment, General James Thomas
 1st Regiment,  Bodfish Company (Company D), Captain Charles N. Bodfish 
 1st Regiment, Simmons Company, Charles Simmons 
 1st Regiment, Cummings Company, Captain George W. Cummings
 1st Regiment, Wardell Company, Ira Wardwell
 1st Regiment, Pike Company, Captain Jabez T. Pike
 1st Regiment, Nutting Company, Jesse Nutting
 1st Regiment, Morrill Company, Captain John H. Morrill
 1st Regiment, McCluskey Company (Company B), Captain John McCluskey
 1st Regiment, Thomas and Tripp Company, General James Thomas and Samuel Tripp
 1st Regiment, Goodwin Company (Company C), Captain Moses Goodwin Jr.
 1st Regiment, Young Company, Moses H. Young
 1st Regiment, Smith Company (Company G), Wendell L. Smith

Massachusetts
 Regiment of Massachusetts Volunteers, for the duration of the Mexican War, January and February, 1847 – July 1848. Colonels: Caleb Cushing, (15 January 1847: promoted to Brig. General); Isaac H. Wright (Lt Colonel to 27 May 1847).

Michigan
 Regiment of Michigan Volunteers, for the duration; December 1847 – July 1848. Colonel Thomas B.W. Stockton (former 1st Lieutenant, 1st. U.S. Infantry)
 Independent Company of Michigan Volunteers, for the duration, 18 June 1847 – 30 June 1848. Captain Morgan L. Gage

Mississippi

 1st Regiment of Mississippi Rifles, volunteers for 12 months; June 1846 – June 1847.  Colonel Jefferson Davis (former 1st Lieutenant and Adjutant 1st. Dragoons; severe wound, at Buena Vista)
 2nd Regiment of Mississippi Volunteers, for the duration; received January 1847 – July 1848. Colonels: Reuben Davis (resigned October 1847); Charles Clark (Captain to 16 October 1847)
 1st Battalion of Mississippi Rifle Volunteers, for the duration, (5 companies); October and November 1847 – June 1848. Lt. Colonel James Patton Anderson

Missouri
 1st Regiment of Missouri Mounted Volunteers, for 12 months; (8 companies); June 1846 – June 1847. Colonel Alexander W. Doniphan
 Battalion of Missouri Volunteers, for 12 months; (3 Light Artillery companies; 2 Infantry companies); June and July 1846 – June and July 1847. Major Meriwether L. Clark (former 2nd Lieutenant 6th U.S. Infantry and Aide de Camp to General Scott)
 Battalion of Missouri Mounted Volunteers, for 12 months,(4 companies, first mustered in Price's regiment); August 1846 – August 1847. Lt. Colonel David Willock
 9 Companies of Missouri Volunteers, for 12 months; received at Fort Leavenworth August and September 1846, order of service countermanded by War Department, September 1846
 Battalion of Missouri Volunteers for during the war with Mexico, (5 companies); May 1847 – October 1848. Lt. Colonel Alton R. Easton (late Colonel "St. Louis Legion.")
 3rd Regiment of Missouri Mounted Volunteers, for the duration; July 1847 – October 1848. Colonel John Ralls
 Battalion of Missouri Mounted Volunteers, for the duration, (5 companies); August 1847 – November 1848. Lt. Colonel Ludwell E. Powell
 Battalion of Missouri Mounted Volunteers, for the duration, (5 companies); September 1847 – October 1848. Lt. Colonel William Gilpin (late Major of Doniphan's Regt.)

New Jersey
 Battalion of New Jersey Volunteers, for the duration, (4 companies); September 1847 – July 1848. Lt. Colonel Dickinson Woodruff

New York
 1st Regiment of New York Volunteers, for service in California and the duration of the war with Mexico; (originally designated 7th Regiment of New York Volunteers) August–October 1848. Colonel Jonathan D. Stevenson
 2nd Regiment of New York Volunteers, for the duration; (originally designated 1st Regiment of New York Volunteers) November 1846 – August 1848. Colonel Ward B. Burnett (former 2nd Lt. 2nd U.S. Artillery, severely wounded at Churubusco)

North Carolina
 Regiment of North Carolina Volunteers, for the duration; January 1847 – August 1848. Colonel Robert T. Paine

Ohio
 1st Regiment of Ohio Volunteers, for 12 months; June 1846 – June 1847. Colonel Alexander M. Mitchell (former 2nd Lieutenant, 4th U.S. Infantry, wounded at Monterey)
 2nd Regiment of Ohio Volunteers, for 12 months; June and July 1846 – June 1847. Colonel George W. Morgan
 3rd Regiment of Ohio Volunteers, for 12 months; June 1846 – June 1847. Colonel Samuel R. Curtis (former 2nd Lieutenant, 7th U.S. Infantry and Adj. General of Ohio)
 4th Regiment of Ohio Volunteers, 1st Regiment for the duration; May and June 1847 – July 1848. Colonel Charles H. Brough
 5th Regiment of Ohio Volunteers, 2nd Regiment for the duration; 1 September 1847 – July 1848.  Colonel William Irvin (late Lt. Colonel of Morgan's Regt.)
 Independent Companies of Ohio Volunteers, for the duration:
 1st Company of Mounted Men; 1 June 1847 – 2 August 1848. Captain John R. Duncan
 2nd Company of Foot; October 1847 – July 1848, (served with Irvin's Regt.). Captains: William Keimeally (died, reported suicide, at Rio Frio, 21 December 1847). William H. Lytle
 3rd Company of Foot; 26 October 1847 – 17 July 1848. Captain Robert F. Riddle

Pennsylvania
 1st Regiment of Pennsylvania Volunteers, for the duration; December 1846 – July and August 1848. Colonel Francis M. Wynkoop
 2nd Regiment of Pennsylvania Volunteers, for the duration, (12 companies); January 1847 – July 1848.  Colonels: William B. Roberts (died in City of Mexico 3 October 1847); John W. Geary (Lt. Colonel to 3 November 1847, wounded at Chapultepec.)

South Carolina
 Regiment of South Carolina Volunteers, for the duration, "Palmetto Regiment"; December 1846 – June and July 1848. Colonel Pierce M. Butler (twice wounded, and killed at Churubusco)

Tennessee
 Regiment of Tennessee Mounted Volunteers, for 12 months; June 1846 – May 1847. Colonel Jonas E. Thomas
 1st Regiment of Tennessee Volunteers, for 12 months, (12 companies); May and June 1846 – May 1847. Colonel William B. Campbell (former Capt. in Trousdale's Regt. in Florida War)
 2nd Regiment of Tennessee Volunteers, for 12 months, (8 companies); June 1846 – May 1847. Colonel William T. Haskell
 3rd Regiment of Tennessee Volunteers, for the duration; October 1847 – July 1848. Colonel Benjamin F. Cheatham (late Capt. in Campbell's Regt.)
 4th Regiment of Tennessee Volunteers, for the duration, (9 companies); November 1847 – August 1848. Colonel Richard Waterhouse (late Major in Thomas' Regt. Cav.)
 5th Regiment of Tennessee Volunteers, for the duration, (11 companies); December 1847 – July 1848. Colonel George R. McClellan

Texas

 General Staff of Texas Volunteers; July 1846 – October 1846. Major General (Gov.) James Pinckney Henderson.
 1st Regiment of Texas Mounted Rifle Volunteers, June and July, and discharged September and October 1846.  Colonel John C. Hays (late Major of a Batt. in the service of Texas.)
 2nd Regiment of Texas Mounted Volunteers, June and July, and discharged October 1846. Colonel George T. Wood
 Regiment of Texas Rifle Volunteers, May, June and July, and discharged August 1846. Colonel Albert Sidney Johnston (former Adjutant U.S. 6th Infantry and Adjutant General of Texas.)
 Regiment of Texas Mounted Volunteers, for 6 months (7 companies), for frontier defense; July, and discharged September 1846.  Colonel William C. Young
 Battalion of Texas Mounted Volunteers, of (4 companies); March 1847 – June 1848.  Majors : Michael H. Chevallie (late of Major Hays 1st Regt.; resigned 31 August 47); Walter P. Lane (Captain to October 1847)
 Regiment of Texas Mounted Volunteers, for 12 months and during the war; April 1847 – May 1848. Colonel John C. Hays (Col. of 1st Regt. Vols, and continued in service)
 Regiment of Texas Mounted Volunteers, for 6 months, for frontier defense; 11 May, and discharged June 1847.  Colonel John C. Hays (Col. of Regt. in Mexico)
 Battalion of Texas Mounted Volunteers,(part of Col. Hays regiment) (5 companies), for local defense; April – 5 June 1847. Major Thomas J. Smith
 Independent Companies of Texas Volunteers:
 1st Mounted Company; 25 September 1845 – 25 June 1846. Captain John T. Price
 2nd Company of Rangers; September and 10 December 1845 and March 1846, for two periods of 3 months each – July 1846. Captain Peter Hansbrough Bell (had before served on frontier defence of Texas, under Major Hays from September 1845)
 3rd Mounted Company; 1 October 1845 and January 1846 – September 1846. Captain David C. Cady
 4th Mounted Company; May and August 1846 – 18 September 1846. Captain Ben M'Culloch
 5th Mounted Company; July–October 1846. Captain Eli Chandler 
 6th Mounted Company; July 1846 – July 1847. Captain Mabery B. Gray (late 1st Lt. in Bell's co.)
 7th Company of Foot Volunteers (first enrolled in Mississippi); August 1846 – 7 January 1847. Captain William E. Shivors (late Capt in Johnston's 3rd Rifle Regt.)
 8th Rifle Company; (late Seefeld's Company of Johnston's 3rd Regt.); received 1 September 1846 – 1 July 1847.  Captain P. Edward Connor (late 1st Lt. to December 1846: wounded at Buena Vista; retired May 1847.)
 9th J Company Volunteers (at Monterey); 8 October 1846 – October 1847.  Captain Mirabeau B. Lamar (late Division Inspector to Maj. Gen. Henderson)
 10th I Company Volunteers; October 1846 – October 1847. Captain Shaply P. Ross
 11th Mounted Company of Spies; 31 January – 31 July 1847.  Captain Ben McCulloch (Major in the Staff)

Virginia
 Regiment of Virginia Volunteers, for during the war with Mexico, (14 companies); December 1846 and January 1847 – August 1848. Colonel John Francis Hamtramck (former 2nd Lieutenant, 3rd U.S. Artillery Regiment)

Misc. volunteers
 Battalion of "Santa Fe" Mounted Volunteers, for during the war with Mexico, (4 companies); July and August 1847 – 20 October 1848. Major Robert Walker (late Adjutant of Price's Regt. Missouri Volunteers)

U.S. Navy squadrons serving in the war

Home Squadron

 
 The Home Squadron operated in the Gulf of Mexico and was led by Commodore David Conner. Conner was appointed to command the squadron on 30 December 1843. He was relieved by Commodore Matthew C. Perry on 3 March 1847. The Revenue Marine cutters listed in the U.S. Revenue Marine Service section of this list article were also assigned to the Home Squadron.
 , Captain Samuel Livingston Breese; Commander John Kelly 
 USS Bonita, Lieutenant Timothy G. Benham
 , Commander George F. Pearson
 , Captain Bladen Dulany; Captain William Jameson
 , Commander Richard S. Pinckney
 USS Electra (ex-Rolla), Lieutenant Timothy A. Hunt
 USS Etna (ex-Walcott), Commander Gershom J. Van Brunt
 , Lieutenant John J. Glasson
 , Commander Joseph R. Jarvis
 , Lieutenant Arthur Sinclair
 , Lieutenant Frederick A. Neville
 , Commander Franklin Buchanan
 , (ex-I.L. Richardson), Lieutenant Archibald B. Fairfax
 Steamship Hunter
 , Commander Henry B. Wilson
 , Commander William J. McCluney
 , Commander Samuel Mercer
 USS Mahonese
 , Captain Andrew Fitzhugh
 USS Morris, (ex-Laura Virginia), Lieutenant William T. Smith
 USS Nonata, Lieutenant Samuel F. Hazard
 , Captain Silas H. Stringham
 , Lieutenant Arthur Sinclair, 1845
 , Lieutenant George S. Blake
 USS Petrel, Lieutenant T. Darrah Shaw
 , (ex-Champion), Lieutenant Samuel Lockwood
 , Lieutenant William E. Hunt
 , Captain John Gwinn
 , Commodore Robert F. Stockton
 , Captain Francis H. Gregory
 , Lieutenant Isaac Sterrett  
 , Lieutenant Oscar Bullus 
 , Commander John L. Saunders 
 USS Santa Anna
 , Commander Irvine Shubrick, 1845; Commander David G. Farragut
 , Commander Abraham Bigelow
 , Lieutenant Charles G. Hunter
 , Commander Duncan N. Ingraham
 , Commander Josiah Tattnall III
  (ex-Howard)
 , Lieutenant John De Camp
 USS Tampico, (ex-Pueblano), Lieutenant William P. Griffin
 , Commander Edward W. Carpender
 
 , (ex-St. Marys), Commander George H. Magruder
 , Commander Joshua Sands  
 USS Washington, Lieutenant Samuel P. Lee
 , Lieutenant George M. Totten

Pacific Squadron
 The Pacific Squadron operated off the Pacific coast of California and Mexico and was led by Commodore John D. Sloat until 29 July 1846; Commodore Robert F. Stockton, 29 July 1846 – 22 January 1847; Commodore W. Branford Shubrick, 22 January 1847 – 1 March 1847. Commodore James Biddle, 1 March 1847 – 19 July 1847. Commodore W. Branford Shubrick, 19 July 1847 – 6 May 1848. Commodore Thomas ap Catesby Jones from 6 May 1848.

 , Captain Thomas W. Wyman
 , Commander Samuel F. Du Pont
 , Captain William Mervine, Commander Samuel F. Du Pont
 , Commander William H. McKean
 , Lieutenant James M. Watson
 , Captain Elie A. F. La Vallette
 USS Julia,  Lieutenant George L. Selden
 , Commander Hugh N. Page
 , Lieutenant Theodore Bailey
 USS Libertad, Lieutenant Tunis Augustus Macdonough Craven
 USS Malek Adhel,  Lieutenant William B. Renshaw
 , Captain Silas H. Stringham
 , Commander John B. Montgomery
 , Commander William F. Shields
 , Captain James Armstrong 
 , Lieutenant Neil M. Howison
 , Lieutenant Robert B. Thorburn
 , Commander Joseph B. Hull
 USS Whiton, Lieutenant Frederick Chatard
 Battalion of Sailors, from the fleet on the Pacific coast, organized by Commodore Robert F. Stockton, for the recapture of Los Angeles, California, January 1847. Major Stephen C. Rowan (Lieutenant U.S. Navy)
 Artillery Company. Captain Richard L. Tilghman (Lieutenant)
 A Company. Captain John Guest (Acting master)
 B Company. Captain William B. Renshaw (Lieutenant)
 C Company. Captain Benjamin F. B. Hunter (Acting Lieutenant)
 D Company. Captain Edward Higgins (Acting Lieutenant)
 E Company. Captain J. Fenwick Stenson (Acting Lieutenant)
 F Company. Captain James M. Duncan (Passed Midshipman)
 G Company. Captain John Peed (Sailmaker)
 Sappers and Miners. Captain John Southwick (Carpenter)

U.S. Marine Corps
 Many of the U.S. Navy Home and Pacific Squadron ships had detachments of U.S. Marine Corps personnel aboard used as ship's guards and as landing party. They were under the direction of the captain of the ship they were assigned. Marine detachments from Home Squadron ships were used as landing party in the capture of Veracruz. Marines under the command of Captain Alvin Edson, USMC, were used to capture and hold Tabasco. The town was garrisoned by a detachment of Marines commanded by Lieutenant William B. Slack, USMC. During the capture of Monterey, 85 Marines and more than 140 sailors from Cyane, Levant, and Savannah were landed and commanded by Captain William Mervine, USN. Seventeen Marines and 57 sailors from Dale were landed and captured La Paz in October 1847. Dale also captured Guayamas in November using 17 Marines and 50 sailors under the command of Lieutenant Thomas O. Selfridge, USN. Marines from Independence, Cyane, and Congress were tasked with garrisoning San Jose in November 1847
 Battalion of Marines; March 1847. Attached to the 3rd Artillery Regiment for garrison duty near Veracruz.
 Battalion of Marines; May 1847 – January 1848. Brevet Lieutenant Colonel Samuel E. Watson. Attached to Brigadier General John A. Quitman's 4th Division consisting of volunteers from New York, Pennsylvania, and South Carolina. Served at the Battle of Chapultepec 13 September 1847.

U.S. Revenue Marine
 The following Revenue Marine cutters were dispatched to serve under the command of the "Commanding General of the Army of Occupation" on 19 May 1846 under orders from the Secretary of the Treasury Robert J. Walker. The squadron was tasked with convoy, towing, and blockade duties as well as transporting troops, supplies, mail, and dispatches for the U.S. Army and was also ordered to cooperate with the U.S. Navy. The squadron was under the overall command of Captain John A. Webster, Sr., who chose Ewing as his flagship. Webster served as squadron commander until 10 December 1846 when he was taken ill by a fever. He was relieved by Captain Winslow Foster who served as squadron commander thereafter.
McLane. Captain William A. Howard, 16 May 1846 – 4 June 1847 
Spencer. Captain Caleb Currier, 16 May 1846 – 14 July 1846
Legare. Captain N.L. Coste, 16 May 1846 – 26 October 1846
Woodbury. Captain William B. Whitehead, 16 May 1846 – 9 July 1846 
Ewing. Captain Gay Moore, 16 May 1846 – 15 April 1847
Forward. Captain Henry B. Nones, 16 May 1846 – 30 April 1847
Van Buren. Captain Thomas C. Rudolph, 16 May 1846 – 31 October 1846
 Four additional cutters were dispatched under either separate orders or at a later date.
Bibb. Captain Winslow Foster, 7 January 1847 – 31 May 1847
Morris. Captain Green Walden, 16 May 1846 – 2 November 1846
Wolcott. Captain Louis C. Fatio (to 1 September 1846), Captain Levy C. Harby (from 1 September 1846), 16 May 1846 – 11 May 1847. Used for carrying dispatches from Mexico to New Orleans, Louisiana. 
Polk. Placed under the command of Lieutenant W.S. Ogdon, U.S. Navy, 14 March 1846 – 3 May 1846

Notes
Footnotes

Citations

References used

 Post Returns, Los Angeles, March and April 1847, National Archives and Records Administration (NARA); Washington, D.C.; Returns from U.S. Military Posts, 1800–1916; Microfilm Serial: M617; Microfilm Roll: 1521
 
 
 
 

 
 
 
 
 
 , OCLC 783494

External links
A Continent Divided: The U.S.-Mexico War, Center for Greater Southwestern Studies, the University of Texas at Arlington

Mexican-American War